Alvania ignota is a species of minute sea snail, a marine gastropod mollusk or micromollusk in the family Rissoidae.

WoRMS taxon details
Alvania ignota Cecalupo & Perugia, 2009
AphiaID
457017  (urn:lsid:marinespecies.org:taxname:457017)

Classification
Biota Animalia (Kingdom) Mollusca (Phylum) Gastropoda (Class) Caenogastropoda (Subclass) Littorinimorpha (Order) Rissooidea (Superfamily) Rissoidae (Family) Alvania (Genus) Alvania ignota (Species)
Status
accepted
Rank
Species
Parent
Alvania Risso, 1826
Orig. name
Alvania ignota Cecalupo & Perugia, 2009
Environment
marine
Original description
Cecalupo & Perugia (2009). Malacologia Mostra Mondiale 63 (2) : 21 [details]   
Taxonomic citation
MolluscaBase eds. (2021). MolluscaBase. Alvania ignota Cecalupo & Perugia, 2009. Accessed through: World Register of Marine Species at: http://www.marinespecies.org/aphia.php?p=taxdetails&id=457017 on 2021-05-24
Taxonomic edit history
Dateactionby
2010-02-12 14:16:04ZcreatedTran, Bastien
2013-11-23 13:22:04ZcheckedBouchet, Philippe
Licensing
Creative Commons License The webpage text is licensed under a Creative Commons Attribution 4.0 License

[taxonomic tree]

Sources (1)
Attributes (3)
original description Cecalupo & Perugia (2009). Malacologia Mostra Mondiale 63 (2) : 21 [details]

Distribution

References

Rissoidae
Gastropods described in 2009